1000-lb Sisters is an American reality television series on TLC which focuses on the personal lives of Amy Slaton-Halterman and her sister Tammy Slaton in Dixon, Kentucky. The show chronicles their daily lives along with their attempts at weight loss and weight loss-surgery.

Cast 
Other than Amy and Tammy, other family members of the show include Amy's husband Michael Halterman and their dog "Little Bit" (deceased). Over time the show has grown to include other members of the Slaton family, such as Chris, Misty, and Amanda. Chris Combs, Amy and Tammy's brother, has also decided to lose weight on the series and continues to do so alongside both his sisters. He accompanies Tammy to her doctor visits. The show has also featured Amy and Michael's son Gage Deon Halterman once Amy found out she was sick and was pregnant while being rushed to the emergency room in the first episode of the second season, "Life-Altering News".

Episodes

Series overview

Season 1 (2020)

Season 2 (2021)

Season 3 (2021–2022)

Season 4 (2023)

References

2020 American television series debuts
2020s American reality television series
English-language television shows
Television series about sisters
Television shows set in Kentucky
TLC (TV network) original programming
Television shows filmed in Kentucky
Webster County, Kentucky